Idol: Jakten på en superstjerne 2007 was the fifth season of Idol Norway based on the British singing competition Pop Idol. In difference to other seasons it was aired in the second half of the year running from September to December 2007.
After a two-year absence Jan Fredrik Karlsen returned to the judging panel as the foreperson. He was joined by Asbjørn Slettemark, Benedicte Adrian and Mariann Thomassen. Also the two hosts were new to the show in person of Marte Stokstad and Kyrre Holm Johannessen.
The Age limit to audition was raised from 28 to 35. Eventual winner Glenn Lyse profited from that rule as he was 33 at the time of his win which also made him the oldest winner of the Idol series worldwide. Lyse beat Bjørn Johan Muri, who was half his age (17), at the final with 56%. However, in a long run the runner-up once again proved to be more successful: In 2010, Muri took part in the Norwegian qualification for the Eurovision Song Contest 2010, with the song "Yes Man". Here he qualified for the final, where he finished fourth overall. Despite that, the single still became a #1 hit in Norway.

Finals

Finalists
(ages stated at time of contest)

Elimination chart

Live show details

Heat 1 (5 October 2007)

Notes
Isabella Leroy and Bjørn Johan Muri advanced to the top 10 of the competition. The other 4 contestants were eliminated.
Anne Lene Nordbø returned for a second chance at the top 10 in the Wildcard Round.

Heat 2 (10 October 2007)

Notes
Timian Naastad and Glenn Lyse advanced to the top 10 of the competition. The other 4 contestants were eliminated.
Anne Sophie Andresen, Linnea Dale and Lisa J. Schjelderup returned for a second chance at the top 10 in the Wildcard Round.

Heat 3 (12 October 2007)

Notes
Kim Rune Hagen and Anne Roalkvam advanced to the top 10 of the competition. The other 4 contestants were eliminated.
Åste Hunnes Sem and Sindre Dybvikstrand returned for a second chance at the top 10 in the Wildcard Round.

Heat 4 (17 October 2007)

Notes
Linda Steen and Marius Barhaugen advanced to the top 10 of the competition. The other 4 contestants were eliminated.
None of the contestants from this round made it into the Wildcard Round, making it the only group to not be represented at that stage.

Wildcard round (19 October 2007)

Notes
Åste Hunnes Sem and Linnea Dale received the highest number of votes, and completed the top 10.

Live Show 1 (26 October 2007)
Theme: Contestant's Choice

Live Show 2 (2 November 2007)
Theme: Disco Fever

Live Show 3 (9 November 2007)
Theme: Dedicated to

Live Show 4 (16 November 2007)
Theme: A-ha

Live Show 5 (23 November 2007)
Theme: Country/Unplugged

Live Show 6 (30 November 2007)
Theme: Big Band

Live Show 7 (7 December 2007)
Theme: Christmas Songs & Duets

Live Show 8: Semi-final (14 December 2007)
Theme: Judge's Choice

Live final (21 December 2007)

References

External links
Profiles of the top 12 finalists

Season 05
2007 Norwegian television seasons